The fifteenth series of the British television drama series Grange Hill began broadcasting on 7 January 1992, before ending on 13 March 1992 on BBC One. The series follows the lives of the staff and pupils of the eponymous school, an inner-city London comprehensive school. It consists of twenty episodes.

Cast

Pupils

Teachers

Others

Episodes

{| class="wikitable" style="width:100%;"
|-
! style="background-color: #333333; color:white"| No.
! style="background: #333333; color:white"| Episode
! style="background: #333333; color:white"| Writer
! style="background: #333333; color:white"| Director
! style="background: #333333; color:white"| Original airdate
|-
| align="center"| 1
| align="center"| Episode One
| align="center"| Chris Ellis
| align="center"| Richard Kelly
| align="center"| 7 January 1992
|-
| style="background:white" colspan="5" |It's love at first sight for Ray when a new American teacher starts, Jacko and his mates start cleaning car windscreens, and Natalie is horrible to everyone.
|- style="background:#333333; height:2px"
| colspan="5" |
|-
| align="center"| 2
| align="center"| Episode Two
| align="center"| Chris Ellis
| align="center"| Richard Kelly
| align="center"| 10 January 1992
|-
| style="background:white" colspan="5" |Ms. Janowitz suggests the idea of a school newspaper, and Nat continues exhibit a changeable personae until it becomes evident that she is just one of a pair of twins.
|- style="background:#333333; height:2px"
| colspan="5" |
|-
| align="center"| 3
| align="center"| Episode Three
| align="center"| Chris Ellis
| align="center"| Richard Kelly
| align="center"| 14 January 1992
|-
| style="background:white" colspan="5" | The windscreen washers accidentally target Mr. Hargreaves's car. He tells Mr. Robson that pupils must stay in at lunchtime, and Ray overhears and circulates a bulletin with the news.
|- style="background:#333333; height:2px"
| colspan="5" |
|-
| align="center"| 4
| align="center"| Episode Four
| align="center"| Chris Ellis
| align="center"| Richard Kelly
| align="center"| 17 January 1992
|-
| style="background:white" colspan="5" |Trainers are banned at school after an expensive pair are stolen. The 5th formers debate "the Individual" versus "the group".
|- style="background:#333333; height:2px"
| colspan="5" |
|-
| align="center"| 5
| align="center"| Episode Five
| align="center"| Sarah Daniels
| align="center"| Albert Barber
| align="center"| 21 January 1992
|-
| style="background:white" colspan="5" |Maria and Richard make fake American trainers, Spanner and Techno use the computer to produce the lines they are given to do, and unauthorised photographers appear in the playground.
|- style="background:#333333; height:2px"
| colspan="5" |
|-
| align="center"| 6
| align="center"| Episode Six
| align="center"| Sarah Daniels
| align="center"| Albert Barber
| align="center"| 24 January 1992
|-
| style="background:white" colspan="5" |At the prompting of the pupils, Mrs. Monroe teaches about disorders of the foot, and using the knowledge the pupils give plausible excuses for trainers to be worn. Justine tapes a revealing interview with Mr. Hargreaves and Alice and Becky find a secret garden. 
|- style="background:#333333; height:2px"
| colspan="5" |
|-
| align="center"| 7
| align="center"| Episode Seven
| align="center"| Sarah Daniels
| align="center"| Albert Barber
| align="center"| 28 January 1992
|-
| style="background:white" colspan="5" |While Chrissy goes into an early labour, almost giving birth in the school loos, Ted seems intent on creating a new life for himself in Southampton.
|- style="background:#333333; height:2px"
| colspan="5" |
|-
| align="center"| 8
| align="center"| Episode Eight
| align="center"| Sarah Daniels
| align="center"| Albert Barber
| align="center"| 31 January 1992
|-
| style="background:white" colspan="5" | Mr. Hargreaves isn't pleased when the newspaper misquotes him as lifting the trainer ban. The piece about cigarettes being sold to first formers provokes violent revenge against Justine.
|- style="background:#333333; height:2px"
| colspan="5" |
|-
| align="center"| 9
| align="center"| Episode Nine
| align="center"| Alison Fisher
| align="center"| Richard Kelly
| align="center"| 4 February 1992
|-
| style="background:white" colspan="5" |Mrs. Keele, Grange Hill's new headmistress, starts. Ted finally goes to see Chrissy and their baby. Jacko sells flowers from the garden to Liam who gives them to Justine.
|- style="background:#333333; height:2px"
| colspan="5" |
|-
| align="center"| 10
| align="center"| Episode Ten
| align="center"| Alison Fisher
| align="center"| Richard Kelly
| align="center"| 7 February 1992
|-
| style="background:white" colspan="5" |The clashes between Natasha and Natalie, and the violence in the peace garden finally all get too much for Becky. The feud with St Joseph's School gathers momentum.
|- style="background:#333333; height:2px"
| colspan="5" |
|-
| align="center"| 11
| align="center"| Episode Eleven
| align="center"| Chris Ellis
| align="center"| Richard Kelly
| align="center"| 11 February 1992
|-
| style="background:white" colspan="5" | Writers' Week causes a bit of a stir, Techno finds out that "LoveByte" isn't quite the girl he was expecting, and without warning, Ray kisses Ms. Janowitz, but Natasha is spying on them.
|- style="background:#333333; height:2px"
| colspan="5" |
|-
| align="center"| 12
| align="center"| Episode Twelve
| align="center"| Chris Ellis
| align="center"| Richard Kelly
| align="center"| 14 February 1992 
|-
| style="background:white" colspan="5" | Natasha "congratulates" Ray and Ms. Janowitz in front of the whole class as if they in a relationship, causing Ray to get into a lot more trouble over the unwanted kiss. Justine plays a trick on the Cigarette Gang, and there's a massive confrontation between St. Joseph's and Grange Hill.
|- style="background:#333333; height:2px"
| colspan="5" |
|-
| align="center"| 13
| align="center"| Episode Thirteen
| align="center"| Kevin Hood
| align="center"| Vivienne Cozens
| align="center"| 18 February 1992
|-
| style="background:white" colspan="5" | A local newspaper reporter steals Justine's unpublished account of the confrontation with St. Joseph's, and Mrs. Keele issues an ultimatum to the school.
|- style="background:#333333; height:2px"
| colspan="5" |
|-
| align="center"| 14
| align="center"| Episode Fourteen
| align="center"| Kevin Hood
| align="center"| Vivienne Cozens
| align="center"| 21 February 1992
|-
| style="background:white" colspan="5" | After Justine intercepts a postcard for Ted a few home truths are revealed. Ted moves away to Southampton, alone. Diane finds a fox's paw print in the garden. Liam has a confrontation with a rival gang.
|- style="background:#333333; height:2px"
| colspan="5" |
|-
| align="center"| 15
| align="center"| Episode Fifteen
| align="center"| Kevin Hood
| align="center"| Vivienne Cozens
| align="center"| 25 February 1992
|-
| style="background:white" colspan="5" |Staff and pupils unite to stop the sale of the Peace Garden land.
|- style="background:#333333; height:2px"
| colspan="5" |
|-
| align="center"| 16
| align="center"| Episode Sixteen
| align="center"| Kevin Hood
| align="center"| Vivienne Cozens
| align="center"| 28 February 1992
|-
| style="background:white" colspan="5" | Ray and the others try to find Liam to stop him joining in the Eagles and Hawks gang fight, but they find he's had an accident en route, and is lying dead in the road.
|- style="background:#333333; height:2px"
| colspan="5" |
|-
| align="center"| 17
| align="center"| Episode Seventeen
| align="center"| Barry Purchese
| align="center"| Nigel Douglas
| align="center"| 3 March 1992
|-
| style="background:white" colspan="5" |Public schoolboys visit Grange Hill, Year Seven find out how environmentally friendly the school is, or rather isn't, and Justine makes a surprise return.
|- style="background:#333333; height:2px"
| colspan="5" |
|-
| align="center"| 18
| align="center"| Episode Eighteen
| align="center"| Barry Purchese
| align="center"| Nigel Douglas
| align="center"| 6 March 1992
|-
| style="background:white" colspan="5" | The visiting public schoolboys find that the girls at Grange Hill are a little more than they can handle. Richard finally gets time alone with Natasha.
|- style="background:#333333; height:2px"
| colspan="5" |
|-
| align="center"| 19
| align="center"| Episode Nineteen
| align="center"| Margaret Simpson
| align="center"| Nigel Douglas
| align="center"| 10 March 1992
|-
| style="background:white" colspan="5" | Richard organizes a collection for Ms. Janowitz, and Chrissy brings her baby to school.
|- style="background:#333333; height:2px"
| colspan="5" |
|-
| align="center"| 20
| align="center"| Episode Twenty
| align="center"| Margaret Simpson
| align="center"| Nigel Douglas
| align="center"| 13 March 1992
|-
| style="background:white" colspan="5" |A fashion show and baseball match bring the school year to a close. Ray's jacket becomes Ms. Janowitz's leaving present, and the Cigarette Gang get expelled.
|- style="background:#333333; height:2px"
| colspan="5" |
|-
|}

DVD release
The fifteenth series of Grange Hill has never been released on DVD as of 2014.

Notes

References

1992 British television seasons
Grange Hill